The Big "O" is a hillside letter representing the University of Oregon, located at Skinner Butte in Eugene, Oregon. Built in 1958, the sign was added to the National Register of Historic Places on September 23, 2010. Every year, members of the university community hike up the butte to give the sign a fresh coat of paint.

See also
 National Register of Historic Places listings in Lane County, Oregon
 O (gesture)

References

1958 establishments in Oregon
Hill figures in the United States
National Register of Historic Places in Lane County, Oregon
University of Oregon